The 2022 Atlantic 10 Conference women's soccer tournament was the postseason women's soccer tournament for the Atlantic 10 Conference held from October 28 through November 6, 2022. The quarterfinals of the tournament were held at campus sites, while the semifinals and final took place at the home stadium of the higher remaining seed. The eight-team single-elimination tournament consisted of three rounds based on seeding from regular season conference play. The defending tournament champions were the Saint Louis Billikens, who successfully defended their championship as the first seed, defeating second seed Dayton in the final.  This was the Billikens' seventh overall tournament title, and coach Katie Shields' fourth title.  Shields and Saint Louis have won five straight Atlantic 10 Tournaments in a row. As tournament champions, Saint Louis earned the Atlantic 10's automatic berth into the 2022 NCAA Division I women's soccer tournament.

Seeding 

The top eight teams in regular season play qualified for the tournament.  Two sets of tiebreakers were needed to determine final seeding for the tournament.  The first tiebreaker was between Saint Joseph's and UMass for the sixth and seventh seeds as both teams finished with fourteen points in conference play.  Saint Joseph's earned the sixth seed for the tournament by virtue of a better composite record versus common conference opponents.  The second tiebreaker determined which team finished eighth and made the tournament versus which team finished ninth and did not qualify for the tournament.  Loyola-Chicago and Fordham both finished with 4–5–1 regular season conference records.  Again, composite record versus common conference opponents was used as the tiebreaker and Loyola-Chicago earned the eighth and final seed to the tournament.

Bracket
Source:

Schedule

Quarterfinals

Semifinals

Final

Statistics

Goalscorers

All Tournament Team 

Source:

MVP in bold

References 

 
Atlantic 10 Conference Women's Soccer Tournament